Adam Dean Friedland (born April 10, 1987) is an American stand-up comedian and podcaster based in New York City. He is best known as a host of the comedy podcast The Adam Friedland Show and its predecessor Cum Town.

Early life
Friedland was born at Saint John's Hospital in Santa Monica, California, to Lithuanian-Jewish South African parents. He grew up in California, South Africa, and Las Vegas. Following high school, Friedland lived in Israel for a year where he worked in the ambulance service. Friedland studied at George Washington University and intended on pursuing a legal career.

Career
Friedland began his comedy career in Washington, D.C., following his college graduation and deferment from law school in 2009. He formerly worked for Vox Media. For the following two-and-a-half years, he helped run the DIY venue Subterranean A, which hosted the likes of musical artists Radical Face, Tennis, Secret Society, and comedy acts James Adomian and Wham City. 

He hosted a number of comedy shows, first at Subterranean A and then other venues in the city, gaining notability in the scene for his 'alternative' performance piece-oriented comedy. He also aided in the live series You, Me, Them, Everybody. In 2013 and 2014, he performed at the Bentzen Ball comedy festival and was named in the annual "Best of D.C." list by the Washington City Paper. He moved to New York City in 2014.

In 2016, Friedland joined Nick Mullen and Stavros Halkias as co-host of the comedy podcast Cum Town. The podcast is noted for its absurdist and controversial content. He also co-hosted the sports podcast White Chocolate NBA Pipecast with Halkias from 2017 to 2018. In January 2018, he appeared on i24NEWS to discuss the decline of support for Israel among young American Jews. He was a guest on The Michael Brooks Show and is a recurring guest on Chapo Trap House.

Friedland hosts the alternative comedy show Funny Moms, which originated in Washington D.C. in 2012 with co-host Sara Starmour, but has since moved to Brooklyn.

Personal life
Friedland is Jewish and a critic of Zionism. He is the former fiancé of podcaster and actress Dasha Nekrasova. Friedland lives in New York City.

Works 
Podcasts

 Cum Town (2016–2022)
 White Chocolate NBA Pipecast (2017–2018)
 The Adam Friedland Show (2022–)

References

External links

1987 births
Living people
21st-century American comedians
21st-century American Jews
American male comedians
American people of South African-Jewish descent
American people of Latvian-Jewish descent
American stand-up comedians
American podcasters
Comedians from Virginia
George Washington University alumni
Jewish American male comedians
Jewish socialists
Jewish anti-Zionism in the United States
People from Santa Monica, California